Stitching is a play by Anthony Neilson. It premiered at the Traverse Theatre in Edinburgh on 1st August 2002 and later transferred to the Bush Theatre in London on 12 September 2002.  

The play is notable for being at the centre of a censorship controversy when it was banned from being performed in Malta in 2009.

References

2002 plays
British plays